Orin Hargraves (born 1953) is an American lexicographer and writer. His language reference works include Mighty Fine Words and Smashing Expressions: Making Sense of Transatlantic English (Oxford University Press, 2002),  Slang Rules!: A Practical Guide for English Learners (Merriam-Webster, 2008), and (with Willard Espy)  Words to Rhyme With: A Rhyming Dictionary (2nd edition; Facts on File, 2006). In addition he has contributed definitions and other material to dictionaries and other language reference works issued by Oxford University Press, Cambridge University Press, Longman, Macmillan, HarperCollins, Chambers Harrap, Langenscheidt, Berlitz, Scholastic Corporation, and Merriam-Webster, among others.

Biography
Orin Knight Hargraves was born on September 14, 1953 in Denver, Colorado. He spent most of his childhood in Creede, Colorado and graduated with honors from the University of Chicago in 1977, concentrating in philosophy, language and literature. His nickname during this period was "Buz". He served in the U.S. Peace Corps in Morocco where he taught English in a government lycée. Later he worked in the publishing software industry in Chicago and London. He began his career in lexicography in 1991 in London. He joined the Dictionary Society of North America in 1993 and was elected its vice president/president elect in 2009. He now resides in Niwot, Colorado.

Bibliography

Language Reference
Slang Rules!: A Practical Guide for English Learners (2008) 
The Big Book of Spelling Tests  (2007)
Spell It! study guide for the Scripps National Spelling Bee  (2006–8)
Words to Rhyme With: A Rhyming Dictionary (co-author with Willard Espy) (2006)()
New Words (Editor) (2004)()
 Cucurbits (article in English Today October 2004) (ISSN 0266-0784)
 Long Distance Lexicography: a View from the Field (article in Dictionaries 2004) (ISSN 0197-6745)
 Who Owns English? (article in The Vocabula Review, June 2003)
Mighty Fine Words and Smashing Expressions: Making Sense of Transatlantic English  (2002)()

Selected Dictionaries and Other Reference Works Contributed to
Scholastic Children's Dictionary (2010)
Cambridge Academic Content Dictionary (2009)
 Merriam-Webster's Advanced Learner's English Dictionary (2008)
Cambridge Dictionary of American English (2008)
Concise Oxford English Dictionary (2008)
CollinsCobuild Advanced Dictionary of American English (2007) (
Heinle Picture Dictionary for Children (British English) (2007)
 The Language Report 5: English on the move, 2003–2007 (2007)
 The 5-Minute Linguist: Bite Sized Essays on Language and Languages (2006)
 Berlitz English Pronunciation Program CD (2005)
 Harrap's Spanish and English Dictionary (2005)
Oxford Dictionary of English (2005)
Collins-Cobuild English Usage (2004)
Microsoft Encarta Thesaurus (2004)New Oxford American Dictionary (2004)Cambridge Dictionary of American Idioms (2003)Langenscheidt's Großwörterbuch Muret-Sanders Deutsch-Englisch (2003)Macmillan English Dictionary for Advanced Learners (2002)Oxford Essential Dictionary of the US Military (2001)Merriam-Webster Collegiate Encyclopedia (2000)Encarta World English Dictionary (1999)Longman Interactive American Dictionary CD-ROM (1997)Longman Dictionary of English Language and Culture (1992)

Other Writing
Culture Shock! London: A Survival Guide to Customs and Etiquette (2007)
Culture Shock! Morocco: A Survival Guide to Customs and Etiquette (2007)
Culture Shock!: Chicago at Your Door (2007)

American lexicographers
Living people
1953 births
Writers from Denver
People from Mineral County, Colorado